Bernhard "Bernie" Herms (born March 26, 1972) is a Canadian composer, songwriter, and music producer in Nashville, Tennessee. He has received and been nominated for Grammy Awards, GMA Dove Awards, and GMA Canada Covenant Awards, due to his songwriting and music production work.

Early and personal life 

Herms was born, Bernhard Herms, on March 26, 1972, in Canada, the son of a Pentecostal minister.

His teenage years were mainly spent in Edmonton, Alberta, before he moved to Chilliwack, B.C. and later enrolled in Trinity Western University, in Langley, B.C.

He later moved to the United States, transferring some of his school credits and enrolling in Belmont University in Nashville, Tennessee. Shortly after moving to the school he met classmate Brad Paisley, another aspiring musician with similar taste in music. In an interview with The Canadian Press Herms described their early friendship as Paisley being a "guitar picker from Virginia" while he was "this long-haired classical piano player from Canada." The two men quickly built a friendship and worked with their classmates in the studio on a regular basis.

Herms graduated from Belmont with his baccalaureate degree in Classical Composition, during their 1995 commencement. He was honored by the university in 2009, with their Curtain Call Award.

Music career 

Around the same time Paisley was signed to a record label and brought several of his school friends—including Herms—under his wing as bandmates.

Herms began his own music recording career in 1997, with the studio album, Nocturne, released by Benson Records. The subsequent studio album, Softly & Tenderly, was released by Brentwood Records, in 1998.

Eventually, he began to focus on a songwriting and production career, saying, "I realized my best game was having people I work with discover their best performances."

He has gone on to a successful music production and songwriting career and worked with artists such as Josh Groban, Kelly Clarkson, Barbra Streisand, Selena Gomez, Casting Crowns, Natalie Grant, Danny Gokey, Tauren Wells, and many others.

Herms co-wrote the GMA Dove Award Song of the Year, "East to West", with Casting Crowns vocalist, Mark Hall, at the 39th GMA Dove Awards, in 2008. The song was nominated for the Best Gospel/Contemporary Christian Music Performance at the 50th Annual Grammy Awards ceremony, and the following year at the 51st Annual in the same category.

Throughout his career he has also worked with artists like Josh Groban ("Stages"), Kelly Clarkson ("All I Ask of You" duet with Groban), Andrea Bocelli and Barbra Streisand.

He won a Grammy Award for best contemporary Christian music performance or song for "Thy Will" by Hillary Scott and the Scott Family in 2017. The award was shared with fellow songwriters Hillary Scott & Emily Weisband.

Personal life 

Herms still resides in Nashville with his wife Natalie Grant, whom he married in a ceremony on August 27, 1999. They have three daughters, the first two being twins.

The couple has worked together on music numerous times and frequently speaks about their supportive and collaborative professional relationship.

Both he and Grant were nominated in the same Grammy Awards category for best contemporary Christian music performance or song in 2017. Herms won the award.

References

External links 

 Cross Rhythms artist profile

1972 births
Living people
Canadian Christians
Canadian record producers
Musicians from Nashville, Tennessee
Songwriters from Tennessee